The 2017–18 Aberdeen F.C. season was Aberdeen's 104th season in the top flight of Scottish football and the fifth in the Scottish Premiership. Aberdeen also competed in the League Cup and the Scottish Cup.

Aberdeen also competed in qualifying for the 2017–18 UEFA Europa League.

Summary

June 

In the pre-season, Aberdeen manager Derek McInnes was the subject of press speculation regarding a potential move to English Premier League team Sunderland. After weeks of speculation, McInnes rejected an eventual approach by Sunderland on 15 June and committed his future to the Dons until 2019. Subsequently, only a few days later, he and assistant Tony Docherty, signed a one-year contract extension, keeping them with the club until the summer of 2020.

On 17 June, Jonny Hayes signed for Celtic for £1.3 million plus a season-long loan for Ryan Christie. Christie had been on loan at the club for the second half of last season.

On 26 June, after being linked with Sunderland with manager McInnes, 'keeper Joe Lewis signed a new deal to keep him at the club until 2020.

July 

On 11 July, Shay Logan signed a contract extension until 2020.

On 12 July, Gary Mackay-Steven signed from Celtic for £150,000 on a two-year deal.

On 14 July, former player and Iceland international Kári Árnason re-signed for the club from Omonia on a free, signing a one-year deal. He had originally played for the club in the 2011–12 season.

On 19 July, at least 2 supporters were injured after an attack by Bosnians in the city of Mostar, the night before they were due to play Bosnia and Herzegovina side Široki Brijeg in their Europa League qualifier.

August 

On 3 August, Aberdeen were again knocked out of the Europa League at the third qualifying round stage for the 4th year in a row, this time at the hands of Apollon Limassol. There was yet more trouble for Dons fans, this time during the match and after the final whistle. The club looked into this incident, in which later both clubs were fined by UEFA.

On 10 August, after spending months trying to sign him, Stevie May signed for the Dons for £400,000. Miles Storey the next day joined Partick Thistle for an undisclosed fee.

On 26 August, Aberdeen beat Partick Thistle 4–3 at Firhill, meaning they were the only club in the league to win their first 4 matches of the season.

September 

On 5 September, defender Mark Reynolds signed a contract extension until 2019.

On 21 September, Aberdeen were knocked out of the League Cup at the quarter-final stage, being comfortably beaten 3–0 by Motherwell.

On 30 September, Adam Rooney scored his eighth hat-trick for the Dons in a 3–0 win at home against St Johnstone.

October 

On 16 October, winger Scott Wright signed a contract extension until 2021.

On 19 October, defender Scott McKenna signed a contract extension until 2021.

On 24 October, it was announced that midfielder Kenny McLean would not be renewing his contract at the end of the season.

Subsequently, on 25 October, the Dons suffered their first defeat of the season, being comfortably beaten 3–0 at home to Celtic.

On 30 October, Graeme Shinnie, Kenny McLean and on-loan Celtic player Ryan Christie were called up for Scotland to play the Netherlands for a friendly due to take place on 9 November at Pittodrie.

Also on 30 October, the Dons signed forward and Finland under-18 international Miko Virtanen to the Development squad.

November 

Before, during, and after the early November International break, manager Derek McInnes was continually linked with the vacant Rangers job and he dismissed this in the press to say, "My job is the Aberdeen manager and I'm here to talk about Aberdeen and our upcoming game against Motherwell, its only speculation."

After the club put continual plans in building the new stadium at Kingsford on hold Tom Crotty, a US businessman, invested £775,000 into the project.

December 

On 3 December, speaking after the back-to-back defeats to Rangers, manager Derek McInnes admitted speculation linking him with the vacant Rangers job could be affecting the players after only picking up 7 points from the seven previous matches since Pedro Caixinha was sacked in October.

On 7 December, Derek McInnes rejected an approach from Rangers to stay with the Dons after "weighing up" and "having a lot to consider", embarrassing them in the process. The next day, in an interview, McInnes said "he wasn't prepared to walk away" from the Dons and also saying he was "really happy and didn't want to tarnish relationships."

On 16 December, Gary Mackay-Steven scored his first senior hat-trick in a 4–1 win against Hibernian.

On 28 December, the Dons re-signed Niall McGinn on a three and a half year contract after he terminated his contract with Gwangju. He will officially rejoin the club on 1 January 2018.

January 

On 9 January, Greg Tansey was loaned out to Ross County. This freed a space in the squad to make a signing the following day, Chidi Nwakali, joining on loan from Manchester City.

During the Scottish Football winter break, and as in the previous year, the Dons headed off to Dubai for a week of winter training and played against Uzbekistan side Lokomotiv Tashkent in a friendly in which they lost 2–0.

Before the Scottish Cup match against St Mirren, Craig Storie was released and Frank Ross signed a new deal until 2019 and then immediately loaned to Greenock Morton until the end of the season.

Shortly after the 4–1 Scottish Cup win against St Mirren, it was confirmed that Kenny McLean had signed for Norwich City for an undisclosed fee, believed to be in the region of £200,000, but would stay at the Dons until the end of the season.

February 

On 8 February, Gary Mackay-Steven won the Scottish Cup Goal of the fourth round award for his sensational strike in the previous month's 4–1 win against St Mirren.

On 11 February, Aberdeen qualified for the Quarter Finals of the Scottish Cup by, in the end, convincingly beating Dundee United 4–2.

After regaining second place in the League, Aberdeen lost 2–0 at Hibernian and then lost at home to Celtic by the same scoreline. This was the tenth time in a row that Aberdeen had lost to Celtic under Brendan Rodgers.

On 28 February, after overnight snow and the storm "Beast from the East", Aberdeen's match at Motherwell's Fir Park was postponed.

March 

After signing a new deal in October, on 7 March, defender Scott McKenna signed another contract extension until 2023.

On 12 March, midfielders Kenny McLean and Ryan Christie, and for the first-time defender Scott McKenna, were called up to the Scotland squad for friendlies against Costa Rica and Hungary. McKenna earned his first cap by starting the match against Costa Rica and played the full 90 minutes.

On 13 March, winger Scott Wright was called up for the Scotland under-21s.

April 

Without suspended trio captain Graeme Shinnie, previously ever-present Kenny McLean and right back Shay Logan, Aberdeen lost to Motherwell 3–0 in the semi-final of the Scottish Cup at Hampden Park. After the match, manager Derek McInnes criticised his own recruitment this season.

On 24 April, after the plans had been put on hold, Aberdeen were granted official planning permission to start on the new stadium at Kingsford.

On 25 April, defender Scott McKenna was nominated for Scottish Young Player of the Year.

On 26 April, Aberdeen youth lost the Scottish Youth Cup final to Hibernian youth 3–1 at Hampden Park.

May 

On 5 May, the Dons announced Hamilton Academical youth Lewis Ferguson would be joining the club on 1 July 2018, paying a development fee.

On 6 May, it was announced that former two-time European Cup winning Manager Sir Alex Ferguson underwent an emergency surgery after suffering a brain haemorrhage.

After drawing at home to Rangers and the following day Hearts beating Hibernian, Aberdeen sealed European qualification for the fifth season in a row.

On 10 May, at the Aberdeen FC awards event, Scott McKenna won the player, young player, and goal of the season awards.

On 13 May, on the final day of the season, the Dons won at Celtic Park for the first time in the league since 2004 and also kept a clean sheet there for the first time since 1994, securing runners-up spot in the process with a 1–0 win thanks to a goal from Andrew Considine.

On 14 May, defender Scott McKenna, midfielders Graeme Shinnie, Kenny McLean and Ryan Christie and were called up to the Scotland squad for friendlies against Peru and Mexico.

On the squad for next season, goalie Danny Rogers signed a new 2-year deal, the club announced the loaned players returned to their clubs respectively, and that Nicky Maynard, Kári Árnason, and Daniel Harvie had left the club after their contracts had expired.

Results and fixtures

Pre-season

Scottish Premiership

UEFA Europa League 

Aberdeen qualified for the second preliminary round of the UEFA Europa League by finishing second in the 2016-17 Scottish Premiership.

Qualifying phase

Scottish League Cup

Scottish Cup

Squad statistics

Appearances 

|-
|colspan="17"|Players who left the club or left on loan during the season
|-

|}

Goalscorers 
As of 13 May 2018

Disciplinary record 
As of 13 May 2018

Team statistics

League table

Results by round

Transfers

Players in

Players out

Loans in

Loans out

See also 
 List of Aberdeen F.C. seasons

Footnotes

References 

2017-18
Scottish football clubs 2017–18 season
2017–18 UEFA Europa League participants seasons